The  are three medieval mystery plays dating to the late fourteenth century, written primarily in Middle Cornish, with stage directions in Latin. The metres of these plays are various arrangements of seven- and four-syllabled lines.  means "prompt" or "service book".

First play
The first play, called , begins with the Creation of the World, the Fall of Man, and Cain and Abel, followed by the building of the Ark and the Flood; the story of the temptation of Abraham closes the first act. The second act gives us the history of Moses, and the third represents the story of David and of the building of Solomon's Temple, curiously ending with a description of the martyrdom of St Maximilla as a Christian by the bishop placed in charge of the temple by Solomon.

Second and third plays
The second play, represents the Temptation of Christ in the desert, and the events from the entry into Jerusalem to the Crucifixion, including the Passion. This goes on without interruption into the third play, which gives an account of the Harrowing of Hell, the Resurrection, and the Ascension, with the Legend of St Veronica and Tiberius, the death of Pilate, the release of Joseph of Arimathea and Nicodemus from prison, The Three Marys. As in the Poem of the Passion, the pseudo-Gospel of Nicodemus and other legendary sources are drawn upon.

Relationship to the Legend of the Cross 
However, running through the whole and interwoven with the scriptural narrative comes the beautiful and curious Legend of the Rood (Legend of the Holy Cross). The legend, most of which is in the Ordinalia, is this:

Extant manuscripts
There are three manuscripts of this trilogy in existence:
 Bodley 791, Oxford manuscript of the fifteenth century, given to the Bodleian Library by James Button on 28 March 1614. This manuscript is the original from which the others were copied, and from which Dr Edwin Norris edited the plays in 1859. 
  Bodleian MSS 28556-28557, another Oxford manuscript, presented to the Bodleian Library by Edwin Ley of Bosahan about 1859, with a translation by John Keigwin. The copy of the text is older by a century than the translation. 
 Peniarth MS 428E, a copy which was in the library of Sir John Williams, Bart., of Llansteffan, Carmarthenshire, with an autograph translation by Keigwin. On the death of Sir John it went to the National Library of Wales as part of his bequests.

See also 

, another play in the Cornish language
, another play in Cornish (both plays are dramatisations of legends of Cornish saints, i.e. St Meriadoc and St Kea)
, the common place for an  performance

Footnotes

Citations

References

Editions, translations 
 [edition and translation]
volume 2 (notes)
 Harris, P. P., 'Origo Mundi, First Play of the Cornish Mystery Cycle, The Ordinalia: A New Edition' (unpublished Ph.D. dissertation, University of Washington) [edition]
 The Cornish Ordinalia, trans. by Markham Harris (Washington: Catholic University of America Press, 1969) [translation]
 Ordinalia: The Cornish Mystery Play Cycle, trans. by Alan M. Kent (Francis Boutle Publishers, 2006),  [translation]

Secondary sources 

 (With additional bibliography.)
 A Project Gutenberg eBook.
 A brief history of the Cornish language.

External links 
 Origo Mundi from Wikisource
 Passio Christi from Wikisource
 Resurrexio Domini from Wikisource

14th-century plays
Cornish-language literature
British plays
Christian plays
Theatre in the United Kingdom
Medieval drama
Religious vernacular drama
Literary trilogies
Middle Cornish literature
Pontius Pilate
Harrowing of Hell
Resurrection of Jesus
Ascension of Jesus
The Three Marys
Joseph of Arimathea
Nicodemus